King África is an Argentine dance music project that enjoyed interest in 2000 due to the remake of their own 1993 song "Salta" ("Salta 2000" ft. Mr. Pringles), and also for their cover version of "La Bomba" by the Bolivian group Azul Azul. It was founded in the early 1990s by DJ Martin Laacré.

History
King África was started by Argentinian frontman Martin Laacré. His first appearance on record was August 1992 in the album DJ Dero - Volume 1 with the track "EOE". This was followed in Summer 1993 with "Pontelo Pónselo". The debut album, El Africano, went on sale in mid-1993, reaching platinum status in Argentina and Chile, and featured the single "Salta", that topped the charts across Latin America.

His album Al Palo was released in late 1994. Title single "Al Palo" and also "Mamá Yo Quiero" climbed the charts in all of Latin America. King África was invited and took part in the 1995 International Song Festival of Viña del Mar in Chile.

Then he recorded what would be his next success the album Remix with new versions of their earlier hits and some new songs. The album included the single "Cachete, pechito y ombligo" produced by Sandy & Papo and released in Summer 1996, after which King África returned to his touring organized in many Latin American countries by MTV Latino. He also performed in the Acapulco Festival (Mexico), in Miami, and Sweden.

In 1997 Laacré quit the project, citing artistic and economic differences. He was replaced by the Argentine vocalist of British descent Alan Duffy. From then on the band switched headquarters to Spain, where they achieved greater success because of Alan Duffy's intense tenor vocal range.

The next release was the album Animal another big success throughout Latin America. In 1998 King África started a new Latin American tour, also traveling to Europe, most notably in Spain. He took part in the Carnival of Tenerife where his hit "El Camaleon" was chosen as the number one tune for the carnival.

Efforts to gain truly international fame came with the hit song "La Bomba" and with the European launch of the Greatest Hits album La Bomba (Grandes éxitos), which reached the top of the Spanish top 40. "La Bomba" (King África's cover version of the song by the Bolivian group Azul Azul) became "Song of the Summer", top selling single and top radio play. Seeing great success in European charts, King África toured with 150 concerts in Spain, Portugal, France, Italy, Germany, Belgium, Switzerland, Romania and the Netherlands. La Bomba (Grandes éxitos) became a gold disc in Spain, Portugal and Belgium.

Early in 2001, King África launched "Carnavalito EP" (in advance of his album "Pachanga"), with four songs most notably the song "El Humahuaqueño". In April 2001 he released his new album Pachanga that included topics such as "Comadre Compadre," "El Humahuaqueño" and "Salta" (2001 remix). The latter was used for the advertisement of Pringles potato chips with high global impact. The US and Puerto Rico version of the album "Pachanga" contained a special reggaeton remix of "El Humahuaqueño". The same version went gold in Spain. Billboard magazine nominated King África as "Best Pop Artist revelation to Billboard Latin Awards and album Pachanga as Latin "Album of the Year".

Also in 2001, he was invited to take part in "Son Latino" festival in Tenerife's scenic Playa de las Vistas singing before 250,000 people to a standing ovation. His tour was extended to the United States and Canada, where he was invited to participate in the election of Miss Hawaiian Tropic World held in Las Vegas. The event was broadcast live on television worldwide.

In 2002 the artist released Energía, an album that included songs like "Mete-mete" and "Vitorino", the latter duo with Los del Río (known best for "La Macarena"). In France, he attained gold status with the CD single for "La Bomba (remix)" exceeding sales of 250,000 copies.

In 2003 King África published the album Buena Onda, which contains songs such as "Manteca", "Te Ves Buena", and "Tesouro do Pirata (Onda Onda)". In July 2003 he went to Japan to support a number of presentations on radio and television in the cities of Kyoto, Osaka, Kobe, Yokohama and Tokyo, his album King Africa - Greatest Hits, released in that country, and because that his version of "La Bomba" is one of the three most popular songs from the chart of the Japanese radios do several concerts with great success.

In 2004 Reggaeton Mix went on sale, containing songs such as "Mi Abuela" and the hit "Golosa". That same year King traveled to Africa for the first time Costa Rica for several concerts.

At the beginning of 2005, he participated in the television program Big Brother VIP 2 in Spain. He was the 4th evicted; it introduced the album VIP Party. King África, on this record, released a compilation of 21 songs that have become famous throughout the world, including "The Chocolate Makers Paquito" (a paso doble based on the 1937 work by the Spaniard composer Gustavo Pascual Falcó).

In 2006, King África published the compilation Caribbean 2006 (Vale Music) Song: "Saturday Night" (Di Di La La La), a classic of the 90s, and in 2007 the compilation Caribbean 2007 (Universal - Vale Music) hit the market with his song "Blossom" (Blossom Murderer) (Caribbean Remix), a song that became popular throughout Latin America.

In December 2007, Vale Music celebrated its 10th anniversary by launching the album Vale Music: 10 Years in Our Own Way, which included 17 songs from 17 of its artists. As a veteran artist of Vale Music, King Africa was invited to participate by performing a version of Dragostea din tei by the Moldovan Eurodance recording act O-Zone. The cover was highly accepted through the masses.

In May 2008, Vale Music distributed his successful album Caribbean 2008, including a new summer song called "Chispum". In early June, Vale Music compiled Disco Estrella 2008, which includes a composition by Rodolfo Chikilicuatre. King África: "Dance the chiki chiki," a version they made together for Andreu Buenafuente's program.

His compilation contributed to the success of 10th Annual Latino Dance Vale Music Festival (Spain), in May 2009, and King África contributed to Caribbean 2009: The Summer is Blue with a new composition: "Tiki and Taka".

Alan Duffy is currently active as King Africa, having shows all across South America. His media range has augmented, appearing in television shows, such as Top Show Buenos Aires as a television presenter, or voicing characters in Spanish dubs for movies, such as Olaf for Frozen and Mike Wazowski in Monsters University. In 2017, he has collaborated with DJ Unic and DKB on the medley track  "El Tembleque/El Cocodrilo". Duffy remains close friends with the frontman of DKB, Ariel Rodriguez, a Cuban-based DJ. Past member Martin Laacre has resumed performing under the moniker "King Africa Music", but evidently achieves less success than his counterpart.

Discography

Albums and EPs 
1993 El Africano
1994 Al Palo
1996 Remix
1998 Animal
2000 La Bomba (Grandes éxitos)
2001 Carnavalito EP
2001 Pachanga
2002 Energía
2003 Buena onda
2004 Reggaetón Mix
2005 Fiesta VIP

Singles
1993: "Salta" 
2000: "La Bomba" (AUT #21, BEL (Fl) #2, BEL (Wa) #14, FR #4, IT #10, NED #3, SUI #8) 
2002: "Te ves buena" (FR #51)

References

External links 
 
 Biography

1971 births
Musical groups from Buenos Aires
Living people
21st-century Argentine male singers
20th-century Argentine male singers